Isthminia is an extinct genus of river dolphin-like cetacean from the Late Miocene epoch (Hemphillian in the NALMA classification) that lived in Panama. The type species is I. panamensis.

Description 
Fossils of Isthminia were found in the Chagres Formation in Panama. Isthminia probably had a predominantly marine lifestyle.

References 

Miocene cetaceans
Miocene mammals of North America
Hemphillian
Neogene Panama
Fossils of Panama
Fossil taxa described in 2015